Sefid Ab (also Romanized as Sefīd Āb and Safīd Āb) is a village in Rudbar-e Mohammad-e Zamani Rural District, Alamut-e Gharbi District, Qazvin County, Qazvin Province, Iran. At the 2006 census, its population was 507, in 110 families.

References 

Populated places in Qazvin County